Muhammad Naji Shawkat Bey (May 26, 1891 – May 11, 1980) was an Iraqi politician who served as the prime minister of Iraq under King Faisal I.

Early life
Muhammad Naji Shawkat was born to an Arabized family of Georgian origins in the Iraqi town of al-Kut where his father was stationed as provincial governor. He had three brothers: Saaib, Sami and Rifat and a sister. Concurrent with Naji's conclusion of his school education in Baghdad, his father was elected to the Ottoman parliament of 1909, thereby providing him with the opportunity to join the Ottoman Law School in Istanbul.

Military service
Naji Shawkat was the assistant general prosecutor in the Iraqi city of al-Hila when World War I broke out, upon which he interrupted his legal career and joined the Ottoman army as a reserve officer. After two years of involvement in the Ottoman military defense of Iraq, Shawkat was captured by the advancing British troops in March 1917. He was subsequently taken to a British Indian prison camp where he, like many other detained Arab officers, was offered the choice of joining the Arab Revolt, an offer he promptly accepted.

Political career

Naji Shawkat Ministry 
The Ministry of Nagy Shawkat consisted of the following ministers:

 Finance Minister, Nusrat Al-Farsi
 Minister of Justice, Jamil Al-Wadi
 Minister of Economy and Communications, Jalal Baban
 Minister of Defense, Rashid Al-Khoja
 Foreign Minister, Abdul Qadir Rashid
 Minister of Education, Abbas Mahdi

Prime Minister of Iraq 
In 1932, Shawkat was called on by Faisal to head a non-partisan government that was intended to clear the political congestion which accompanied the signing of the Anglo-Iraqi treaty. Faced with strong opposition from within the Iraqi political establishment and the anti-treaty campaign, Shawkat's government lasted only five months. Thereafter, he was appointed as representative of Iraq in Ankara where he cultivated strong relations with the Turkish ruling circles and developed a sense of admiration for modern Turkey.

References

External links

1890s births
1980 deaths
Naji Shawkat
Arabs from the Ottoman Empire
Prime Ministers of Iraq
Ambassadors of Iraq to Turkey
Justice ministers of Iraq
Istanbul University Faculty of Law alumni
Arab collaborators with Nazi Germany